Slussenområdet (the Sluice area) is an area of central Stockholm, on the Söderström river, connecting Södermalm and Gamla stan. The area is named after the locks between Lake Mälaren and the Baltic Sea. Called Karl Johanslussen, the locks themselves allow passage between these two bodies of water (of different levels). Slussen also refers to the cloverleaf interchange and associated pedestrian passages and walkways opened on 15 October 1935.

The Slussen metro station is a hub of public transport in Stockholm, serving the red and green lines of the Stockholm Metro, with an adjoining bus terminal and Saltsjöbanan commuter rail station serving the eastern parts of Stockholm and its surroundings. The Djurgården ferry departs adjacently.

History
It is unclear exactly when the channel at Slussen was created, but in the centuries up to the 17th century the differences in level between Lake Mälaren and the Baltic Sea made it increasingly difficult to pass through the Söderström channel. The first lock was built here in 1642, Queen Christina's Lock. By the early 1700s the lock proved too small and in 1751 the Christopher Polhem Lock was completed. In 1850 an even larger lock was completed, the Nils Ericson lock.

In the 1860s rail traffic started crossing the locks and in the ensuing decades more and more wagon and carriage traffic, as well as pedestrians, crossed the lock between Gamla Stan and the Södermalm suburb. Various plans to improve the traffic situation were drawn up between 1895 and 1919.

With the arrival of the automobile, by the 1920s, the traffic situation was being called "Slussen Misery" (Slusseneländet) in the press. In 1930 a committee was appointed with the task of solving this and other traffic congestion issues. (See article in Swedish Wikipedia) In 1931 a total overhaul of Slussen was funded. Buildings were demolished, a new Karl-Johan Lock was built, and a cloverleaf interchange was built. Pedestrian tunnels and walkways were built on three different levels. The project was praised by Le Corbusier as "the modern era's first large project".

Political plans for reshaping the area began in the 1970s. A vigorous discussion in Swedish media followed with some arguing that Slussen was a unique historic example of traffic engineering and thus should be preserved, while others argued that many of the original design features were either no longer needed due to other traffic relief projects such as tunnels that had been completed over the previous few decades, or were unusable due to physical deterioration of the structure.

After conducting a competition, in May 2009 the city of Stockholm announced that the firm of Norman Foster had been selected to create a new master plan of the Slussen area. The design of Foster and Partners features two linked pedestrian bridges and one for traffic. It removes many of the existing roads and creates several new blocks of buildings in proximity to the waterfront.

The interchange was closed in 2016 and the demolition of the present structure started. The area will be a construction site for the next eight to ten years.

Galleries

See also 
 Gamla stan
 Karl Johanslussen
 Slussen metro station
 Södermalm

References
See list in Swedish Wikipedia article.

External links 

Geography of Stockholm
Locks of Sweden
Buildings and structures in Stockholm